The 2012 Chinese Super League was the ninth season since the establishment of the Chinese Super League, the nineteenth season of a professional football league and the 51st top-tier league season in China. It began on March 10, 2012 and ended on November 3, 2012.

The matches that were intended to be held on September 15 and 16, 2012 were suspended for a later date due to an international dispute between China and Japan over the Senkaku Islands. With Hangzhou Greentown F.C. having a Japanese manager and several Chinese demonstrations arising throughout China it was decided that the September 23, 2012 match against Liaoning Whowin F.C. should be played behind closed doors with the Xianghe National Football Training Base used as a neutral venue.

Promotion and relegation 
Teams promoted from 2011 China League One
 Dalian Aerbin F.C.
 Guangzhou R&F F.C.

Teams relegated to 2012 China League One
 Chengdu Blades F.C.
 Shenzhen Ruby F.C.

Clubs

Clubs and locations

Managerial changes

International players

The number of foreign players is restricted to five per CSL team, including a slot for a player from AFC countries. A team can use four foreign players on the field in each game, including at least one player from the AFC country. Players from Hong Kong, Macau and Chinese Taipei are deemed to be native players in CSL.

 Specially, Guangzhou Evergrande can use seven foreign players since June, 2012, for it is the only team still active at 2012 AFC Champions League.
 Foreign players who left their clubs after first half of the season.

League table

Positions by round

Results

Goalscorers

Top scorers

Hat-tricks

Awards
 Chinese Football Association Footballer of the Year:  Cristian Dănălache (Jiangsu Sainty)
 Chinese Super League Golden Boot Winner:  Cristian Dănălache (Jiangsu Sainty)
 Chinese Super League Domestic Golden Boot Award:  Wang Yongpo (Shandong Luneng Taishan)
 Chinese Football Association Goalkeeper of the Year:  Deng Xiaofei (Jiangsu Sainty)
 Chinese Football Association Young Player of the Year:  Zhang Xizhe (Beijing Guoan)
 Chinese Football Association Manager of the Year:  Dragan Okuka (Jiangsu Sainty)
 Chinese Football Association Referee of the Year:  Tan Hai (Beijing)
 Chinese Super League Fair Play Award: Hangzhou Greentown, Jiangsu Sainty, Shandong Luneng Taishan
 Chinese Super League Team of the Year (442):
GK  Deng Xiaofei (Jiangsu Sainty) 
DF  Sun Xiang (Guangzhou Evergrande),  Du Wei (Shandong Luneng Taishan),  Dino Djulbic (Guizhou Renhe),  Zheng Zheng (Shandong Luneng Taishan)
MF  Yu Hanchao (Liaoning FC),  Zheng Zhi (Guangzhou Evergrande),  Darío Conca (Guangzhou Evergrande),  Wang Yongpo (Shandong Luneng Taishan)
FW  Cristian Dănălache (Jiangsu Sainty),  Gao Lin (Guangzhou Evergrande)

Attendance

League Attendance

Top 10 Attendances

References

External links
Current CSL table, and recent results/fixtures at Soccerway
Chinese Super League official site 

Chinese Super League seasons
1
China
China